The 2010 IAAF World Race Walking Cup was held on 15 and 16 May 2010 in the streets of Chihuahua, Mexico.

Detailed reports on the event and an appraisal of the results was given for the IAAF.

Complete results were published.

Medallists

Results

Men's 20 km

Team (20 km Men)

Men's 50 km

Team (50 km Men)

Men's 10 km (Junior)

Team (10 km Men Junior)

Women's 20 km

Team (20km Women)

Women's 10 km Junior

Team (10km Women Junior)

Participation
The participation of 264 athletes (169 men/95 women) from 42 countries is reported.

 (9/6)
 (-/1)
 (-/3)
 (3/2)
 (3/-)
 (2/-)
 (13/8)
 (7/3)
 (2/-)
 (3/2)
 (-/1)
 (8/4)
 (3/3)
 (1/-)
 (12/4)
 (3/-)
 (5/4)
 (1/1)
 (12/3)
 (4/3)
 (-/2)
 (12/7)
 (2/-)
 (1/-)
 (1/-)
 (-/2)
 (8/5)
 (7/4)
 (1/-)
 (-/1)
 (12/8)
 (4/1)
 (1/-)
 (1/1)
 (13/8)
 (3/-)
 (-/1)
 (2/1)
 (1/-)
 (-/1)
 (8/3)
 (-/1)

References

External links
Official IAAF website for the 2010 IAAF World Race Walking Cup
Results IAAF

World Athletics Race Walking Team Championships
World Race Walking Cup
Walk
International athletics competitions hosted by Mexico